Ayesha Aziz (died 25 August 1998), popularly known as Marvi, was a Pakistani cinema actress. She was one of the few Sindhi actresses that made a career in Lollywood. Her career was cut short when she was murdered on 25 August 1998.

Career 
Hailing from Sindh, Marvi became one of the few Sindhi actresses to make a career in Lollywood industry. The actress had a promising career in the film industry, quickly becoming popular despite her tragically short career. Marvi was the lead actress in the hit film Marvi, starring alongside fellow actor Faisal Qureshi. She starred in 3-4 films, with Marvi being her last, which was released after her death.

Death 
Marvi's career had barely started when she was brutally murdered by an unknown person or animal on 25 August 1998.

The incident took place in Karachi, where a supposed jealous lover shot her in her car near a traffic signal on Tariq Road. Her dead body remained in the car for a number of hours until help arrived. Sadly, by the time the emergency services arrived, she was already dead.

The murderer remains unknown after fleeing the scene, and the case remains unsolved. No arrests have been made. In the past, many other Lollywood actresses, namely Niggo, Nadra, Karishma Shah, Sangam and more have shared a similar fate.

Filmography
 Name: Marvi - Language:  Urdu - Year: 2000

References 

20th-century Pakistani actresses
1998 deaths
Pakistani murder victims
Pakistani film actresses
People from Sindh
Sindhi people
Year of birth missing
Place of birth missing